Paora Kaiwhata (died 19 May 1892) was a New Zealand tribal leader. Of Māori descent, he identified with the Ngati Kahungunu iwi. He was born in Rakato Pa, on the shore of Oingo Lake, Hawke's Bay, New Zealand. His father was Rawiri Tareahi and his mother was Whareunga. He was said to be 80 years old when he died on 19 May 1892.

References

1892 deaths
People from the Hawke's Bay Region
Ngāti Kahungunu people
Year of birth unknown